Teaselville, also known as Loftin, is an unincorporated community in Smith County, Texas, United States.

History
Teaselville was inhabited by 1846, and the community was formed in 1850. A post office opened in Teaselville in 1900 and closed by 1936. The population of Teaselville was 150 in 2000.

Currently, the town consists of a coffee shop and a Dollar General.

References

Unincorporated communities in Smith County, Texas
Unincorporated communities in Texas